Andrey Aleksandrovich Podavalov (Russian: Андрей Александрович Подавалов), is a Russian politician who had been the acting Plenipotentiary Representative in the State Duma in 2009.

Biography

He was the head of the Department for Ensuring the Activities of Plenipotentiary Representatives of the President of Russia in the Constitutional Court of Russia and the Chambers of the Federal Assembly of the Office of the President of the Russian for Internal Policy.

On 22 January 2009, Podavalov was appointed the acting Plenipotentiary Representative in the State Duma, 2 weeks after the former plenipotentiary representative, Aleskandr Kosopkin died in a plane crash on 9 January. He was officially replaced by Garry Minkh on 12 February.

References

Year of birth missing (living people)
Living people
Russian politicians